Thesprotia graminis, the American grass mantis or grass-like mantis, is a species of mantis native to the Southern United States.  It is found in Florida and Georgia. This species can reproduce parthenogenetically or through sexual reproduction.  T. graminis is similar in appearance to Brunneria borealis.

References

graminis
Insects of the United States
Mantodea of North America
Fauna of the Southeastern United States
Insects described in 1877